Fool Bull also known as Tatanka Witko (1849 – 1909) was a Brulé Sioux medicine man.

Photographer John Alvin Anderson's  famous photo of Fool Bull taken in 1900 at the Rosebud Indian Reservation is at display in the Nebraska State Historical Society.

References

1849 births
1909 deaths
Brulé people
Indigenous American traditional healers